Mandela Park is a neighborhood located within the Khayelitsha urban area of the City of Cape Town in the Western Cape province of South Africa. It was established in 1986 under the apartheid era government of P.W. Botha as a residential area demarcated for black South Africans moving to Cape Town from the Eastern Cape province. It was one of the few areas in South Africa where black South Africans could purchase homes with bank loans in the 1980s. Many of the streets in the neighbourhood are named after anti-apartheid activists. The Mandela Park Backyarders association is based within the community.

References

Suburbs of Cape Town